George Irwin may refer to:

 George Irwin (football manager) (1891–?), manager of the English football clubs Crystal Palace, 1939–1947, and Darlington, 1950–1952
 George A. Irwin (1844–1913), Seventh-day Adventist administrator
 George Rankine Irwin (1907–1998), American scientist in the field of fracture mechanics and strength of materials
 George LeRoy Irwin (1868–1931), U.S. Army general

See also
George Irving (disambiguation)
George Irvine (disambiguation)